Archierato is a genus of small sea snails, marine gastropod mollusks in the family Eratoidae, the false cowries or trivias.

Nomenclature
The name Archierato is not available from Schilder (1932), who did not provide a diagnosis.

Species
 † Archierato accola (Laws, 1935) 
 † Archierato antiqua (P. Marshall, 1919) 
 † Archierato antonioi Fehse & Villacampa, 2018 
 † Archierato aucklandica (Dell, 1950) 
 † Archierato chipolana (Maury, 1910) 
 Archierato columbella (Menke, 1847)
 † Archierato dalli (Morretes, 1941)
 † Archierato domingensis (Maury, 1917) 
 Archierato galapagensis (Schilder, 1933)
 Archierato guadeloupensis Fehse & Simone, 2020
 Archierato janae Fehse & Simone, 2020
 Archierato martinicensis (Schilder, 1933)
 Archierato maugeriae (Gray in G. B. Sowerby I, 1832)
 Archierato michaelmonti Fehse & Simone, 2020
 Archierato panamaensis (Carpenter, 1856)
 † Archierato pyrulata (Tate, 1890) 
 Archierato rhondae Fehse & Simone, 2020
 † Archierato simulacrum Laws, 1939 
 † Archierato zepyrulata Laws, 1939

References

 Schilder F.A. (1933). Monograph of the subfamily Eratoinae. Proceedings of the Malacological Society of London. 20: 244–283.

External links
 Fehse D. & Simone L.R.L. (2020). Contributions to the knowledge of the Eratoidae. X. Revision of the genus Archierato Schilder, 1933 (Mollusca: Gastropoda). Zootaxa. 4851(1): 81-110.

Eratoidae